= Imre Demhardt =

Imre Josef Demhardt is a historian of cartography and Garrett professor at the University of Texas at Arlington.
